Lee Sang-il (Korean: 이상일, born 6 January 1974 in Niigata Prefecture, Japan) is a Japanese film director and screenwriter of Korean descent. His first film, Chong, was a short film about the lives of third generation Koreans living in Japan.

His film Unforgiven was screened in the Special Presentation section at the 2013 Toronto International Film Festival.

Filmography
2000 Chong
2002 Border Line
2004 69
2005 Scrap Heaven
2006 Hula Girls
2010 Kaidan - Horror Classics (Ayashiki Bungo Kaidan) in ep. 3 "The Nose" (TV series)
2010 Villain
2013 Unforgiven
2016 Rage
2017 The Blue Hearts
2022 Wandering

References

External links

 

1974 births
Living people
Japanese film directors
Japan Academy Prize for Director of the Year winners
People from Niigata Prefecture
Zainichi Korean people